Hemiphyllodactylus is a genus of geckos ranging from India and China southward to Southeast Asia and Oceania. Species of Hemiphyllodactylus are commonly known as half leaf-fingered geckos. Many species are known as dwarf geckos or slender geckos.

Species
Hemiphyllodactylus arakuensis 
Hemiphyllodactylus aurantiacus  – Southern Ghats slender gecko
Hemiphyllodactylus banaensis    – Ba Na dwarf gecko
Hemiphyllodactylus bintik   – spotted dwarf gecko
Hemiphyllodactylus bonkowskii   – Bonkowski’s slender gecko
Hemiphyllodactylus changningensis   – Changning slender gecko
Hemiphyllodactylus chiangmaiensis   – Chiang Mai dwarf gecko
Hemiphyllodactylus cicak   – Penang Island slender gecko 
Hemiphyllodactylus dalatensis   
Hemiphyllodactylus dupanglingensis   – Dupangling slender gecko 
Hemiphyllodactylus dushanensis   – Dushan slender gecko, Dushan gypsy gecko, or Dushan dwarf gecko
Hemiphyllodactylus engganoensis   – Pulau Enggano dwarf gecko
Hemiphyllodactylus flaviventris   – yellow-bellied dwarf gecko
Hemiphyllodactylus ganoklonis   – Palauan slender gecko
Hemiphyllodactylus goaensis   – Goan slender gecko
Hemiphyllodactylus harterti   – Bintang slender gecko, Hartert's slender gecko
Hemiphyllodactylus hongkongensis   – Hong Kong slender gecko
Hemiphyllodactylus huishuiensis  
Hemiphyllodactylus indosobrinus  
Hemiphyllodactylus insularis  – Philippine slender gecko 
Hemiphyllodactylus jinpingensis   – Jinping slender gecko, Jinping gypsy gecko, or Jinping dwarf gecko
Hemiphyllodactylus jnana 
Hemiphyllodactylus khlonglanensis   – Khlong Lan dwarf gecko
Hemiphyllodactylus kiziriani   – Kizirian's slender gecko
Hemiphyllodactylus kolliensis 
Hemiphyllodactylus kyaiktiyoensis  – Kyaiktiyo Mountain slender gecko
Hemiphyllodactylus larutensis  – Larut dwarf gecko
Hemiphyllodactylus linnwayensis  – Lynn-Way dwarf gecko
Hemiphyllodactylus longlingensis   – Longling slender gecko, Longling gypsy gecko, or Longling dwarf gecko
Hemiphyllodactylus margarethae   – Sumatran slender gecko
Hemiphyllodactylus minimus  – Ganjam slender gecko
Hemiphyllodactylus montawaensis  – Montawa dwarf gecko
Hemiphyllodactylus nahangensis   – Nahang slender gecko
Hemiphyllodactylus ngwelwini  – Ngwe Lwin’s slender gecko
Hemiphyllodactylus ngocsonensis   – Ngocson slender gecko
Hemiphyllodactylus nilgiriensis  – Nilgiris slender gecko
Hemiphyllodactylus pardalis   – spotted slender gecko
Hemiphyllodactylus peninsularis  – KMTR slender gecko
Hemiphyllodactylus pinlaungensis  – Pinlaung slender gecko
Hemiphyllodactylus serpispecus  
Hemiphyllodactylus simaoensis  
Hemiphyllodactylus tehtarik   – Tebu Mountain slender-toed gecko
Hemiphyllodactylus titiwangsaensis   – Titiwangsa slender gecko
Hemiphyllodactylus tonywhitteni  – Phapant dwarf gecko
Hemiphyllodactylus typus  – Indopacific tree gecko, Indopacific slender gecko, or common dwarf gecko
Hemiphyllodactylus typus chapaensis 
Hemiphyllodactylus typus pallidus 
Hemiphyllodactylus typus typus  
Hemiphyllodactylus uga  – Uga's slender gecko
Hemiphyllodactylus yanshanensis  
Hemiphyllodactylus yunnanensis  – Asian slender gecko, Yunnan gypsy gecko, or Yunnan dwarf gecko
Hemiphyllodactylus ywanganensis  – Ywangan slender gecko
Hemiphyllodactylus zalonicus   – Mt. Zalon slender gecko
Hemiphyllodactylus zayuensis    
Hemiphyllodactylus zugi   – Zug's slender gecko
Hemiphyllodactylus zhutangxiangensis 
Hemiphyllodactylus zwegabinensis  – Zwegabin Mountain slender gecko

Nota bene: In the above list, a binomial authority in parentheses indicates that the species was originally described in a genus other than Hemiphyllodactylus.

Notes

Further reading
Bleeker P (1860). "Reptiliën van Agam aangeboden door E. W. A. Ludeking ". Natuurkundig Tijdschrift voor Natuurkundige Vereeniging in Nederladsch Indië, Batavia 20: 325-329. (Hemiphyllodactylus, new genus, p. 327). (in Dutch).

 
Lizard genera
Taxa named by Pieter Bleeker